Ruuben Kaalep (born on 21 September 1993 in Tallinn) is an Estonian politician, poet and a far-right (self-styled ethnofuturist) philosopher. He has been member of XIV Riigikogu. He is a founder of the Conservative People's Party of Estonia's youth organization Sinine Äratus ('Blue Awakening'). Since 2012, he is a member of Estonian Conservative People's Party.

Philosophy
In 2020, Arktos Media published the book "Rebirth of Europe: The Ethnofuturist Manifesto" by Kaalep and August Meister, in which the authors outline their ethnofuturist philosophy. They envision in ethnofuturism a "nationalism of a completely new type", which would be open to global nationalist cooperation and help to find "a balance between the old traditions and the dynamic energy that propels us into the future".

Essential to their philosophy is something Kaalep and Meister call "the Organic Principle," which involves a nondualist realization of existence, uniting seemingly opposite concepts of good and evil or spiritual and physical reality. They accept conflict and struggle as natural counterparts of life, while stressing that universal inequality allows the world to be dynamic and to evolve. In movement, differentiation and inequality, Kaalep and Meister see a "circle of life".

Kaalep and Meister claim that through this absolute, a denial of either man's spiritual or his physical and bodily nature is dissolved, therefore removing the root cause of nihilism in European culture. They cite ancient Indo-European and Finno-Ugric cosmology as instances of the nondual philosophy within European tradition, while also pointing to its occurrences within Eastern philosophy and the concept of Unus mundus popularized by Carl Jung.

However, according to Kaalep and Meister, the organic principle itself has a dialectical counterpart – the mechanistic principle, which seeks in vain to uphold illusory order against ever-advancing chaos, while the organic principle recognizes chaos too as illusory. In alignment with nondual awareness, these two principles constitute a unified whole, dialectically leading towards increasing complexity and differentiation of the world. Among other things, this gives rise to cyclical history, involving a rhythmic rise and fall of civilizations as described by Oswald Spengler. While Kaalep and Meister draw heavily on Spengler's ideas, they reject a "Spenglerian fatalism" in which such civilizational cycles are seen as closed orbs, and focus on the possibility of rebirth.

The rebirth that Kaalep and Meister envision would not be characterized by a wholesale rejection of modernity, but by subjugating its mechanistic elements to the organic principle. Therefore, they advocate ways to "connect modern technology with the ancient way of being most inherent to man", running contrary to anti-technology right-wingers such as Ted Kaczynski or Pentti Linkola.

Kaalep and Meister accuse globalism, liberalism and the New Left of creating a totalitarian postmodernist consumer culture in the West, in which individual freedom is ultimately illusory, as everyone is divorced from their context and birthright identity. They claim that it has resulted in an unparalleled epidemic of clinical depression in the Western world. They summarize: "Where liberalism talks of diversity, it really aims at erasing all distinctions. Where it talks of multiculturalism, its aims are creating a global melting pot where no cultures survive."

A central element in Kaalep's and Meister's ethnofuturism is identity, described as a spiritual bond that unites past with the future and an individual with their ethnic and cultural reality. Kaalep and Meister focus on ancestral identity as an organic truth which in society provides a defensive mechanism against totalitarianism. They claim that both sex and a nation are inherent to being human.

Accusations of Nazism, anti-Semitism and right-wing extremism 
In April 2019, journalist Mikk Salu published an article in Eesti Ekspress describing incidents from Kaalep's past, which were just a few examples from a long documented history, on the basis of which Salu considered it justified to claim that Ruuben Kaalep is a Nazi and an anti-Semite. 

In high school, Kaalep allegedly directed a play questioning the Holocaust. Between 2009 and 2014, Kaalep was actively involved in the editing of the Estonian section of the anti-Semitic and Nazi online encyclopaedia Metapedia. In 2016, Kaalep posted a photo of himself with US far-right activist Paul Ray Ramsey on his Instagram page, captioning the photo "fashy goyim", which, according to journalist Mikk Salu, means "fascist non-Jews" in neo-Nazi parlance. Kaalep has commented on Salu's allegation: "This is an internet meme, and such an interpretation of the meme rather shows the journalist's inaccuracy."

In March, Kaalep shared a photo of himself and his companions standing behind Simon Wiesenthal Centre director Efraim Zuroff, holding their noses and, in Mikk Salu's opinion, mocking the man. According to Kaalep, this disrespect was not directed at people of Jewish ethnicity, but at Efraim Zuroff alone, who "has for decades made statements that are hostile to Estonia and slanderous of our freedom struggle." In the same year, Kaalep also shared a photo on Twitter in which he poses with American neo-Nazi Richard B. Spencer. According to Kaalep, Spencer wanted to take a picture with him and he "disagrees with very many of his views, including the glorification of imperialism and Russophilia." In February 2019, Kaalep organised Greg Johnson and Olena Semenyaka to perform for the Young Relievers. Semenyaka was the foreign secretary of the Ukrainian parliamentary party, the National Corps and had represented Ukrainian nationalists at meetings and conferences in many European countries. The National Corps was based on the Azov Battalion, whose soldiers were also legally assisted by the Estonian state. Semenyaka was one of the most influential figures in the Ukrainian nationalist movement.

In May 2019, when Marine Le Pen was visiting Estonia for discussions with EKRE, MP Kaalep and Le Pen took a selfie together with both flashing the "OK" hand gesture.

Earlier, in 2015, Ruuben Kaalep's manifestations of far-right extremism had been discussed by historian Aro Velmet, who at the time pointed out that Kaalep had posed with the symbol of the War of Independence Victory Column on the EKRE website. Velmet saw in it the insignia of the Estonian volunteer division in the World War II.

Poetry
In 2020, Kaalep published his first poetry book, Litoriinamere loits & teisi luuletusi. It includes poems written from his high school time up to his parliamentary work.

Kaalep's poetry is considered diverse: there is doggerel, love poetry, nature meditations and ethnofuturism. According to Karl Martin Sinijärv, Kaalep is able to use his novel imagery and cool substance to create an entirely enjoyable poetic picture out of even old and supposedly boring metre. Rauno Alliksaar, however, has been critical of Kaalep's "dripping and sometimes thinly metaphored patriotism" and Aare Pilv of his "patriotic-militaristic eroticism". Siim Lill, on the other hand, describes Kaalep's poems as "sustained by a thorough self-irony", adding: "The author is aware of the addressees and impact of his words – that his texts irritate even beforehand, that nationalism automatically creates polemics. Thus, for the reader who supports Kaalep's position the texts are amusing, but for the reader who bounces off they become a grain of sand, scratching even when one understands that the words are consciously directed to irritate him."

Kaalep himself has described his poetic credo as follows: "Art is to express what cannot be expressed in words, while poetry is even more complicated, as it returns to express in words what cannot be expressed in words."

In 2022, Kaalep won a special prize at Otepää Parish Rhymed Chronicle awards for his poem "Hexameter of Päidla".

Personal life
His father was poet, playwright, literary critic and translator Ain Kaalep. From 2012 until 2017 he studied history at University of Tartu.

References

	

1993 births
21st-century Estonian poets
Alt-right writers
Conservative People's Party of Estonia politicians
Estonian male poets
Hugo Treffner Gymnasium alumni
Living people
Members of the Riigikogu, 2019–2023
People from Otepää Parish
Politicians from Tallinn
Politicians from Tartu